Howard Benjamin "Hal" Tidrick (August 4, 1915 – April 2, 1974) was an American professional basketball player. He played for the Indianapolis Jets and the Baltimore Bullets of the Basketball Association of America (BAA). He attended college at Washington & Jefferson College.

BAA career statistics

Regular season

Playoffs

References

1915 births
1974 deaths
Baltimore Bullets (1944–1954) players
Basketball players from Ohio
Indianapolis Jets players
Sheboygan Red Skins players
Toledo Jeeps players
Washington & Jefferson Presidents men's basketball players
American men's basketball players
Forwards (basketball)
Guards (basketball)